Iván Rakovszky de Nagyrákó et Kelemenfalva (5 February 1885 – 9 September 1960) was a Hungarian politician, who served as Interior Minister between 1922 and 1926. He reorganized the police services and reformed their orders. In the cabinet of Géza Lakatos, he was the Minister of Religion and Education (and de facto Deputy Prime Minister).

References
 Magyar Életrajzi Lexikon
 Biography with pictures at the Web-site of the family Rakovszky

1885 births
1960 deaths
Politicians from Budapest
Hungarian Interior Ministers
Education ministers of Hungary
Ivan